is a Japanese musician, singer and songwriter from Uwajima, Ehime. His professional music career began in 2001 as vocalist of the band Sound Schedule. Following the band's disbandment in 2006, he began a solo career, releasing his debut single "Honoka Terasu" in 2008. Sound Schedule reunited in 2011, with Ōishi returning as the band's vocalist.

Ōishi is also vocalist of the musical group OxT, led by composer Tom Hack. In 2014, Ōishi's song "Kimi Ja Nakya Dame Mitai" was used as the opening theme to the anime series Monthly Girls' Nozaki-kun, and in 2018, his song "Otomodachi Film" was used as the opening theme to the anime series Tada Never Falls in Love. He has also written songs for other artists, such as "Yōkoso Japari Park e" which was used as the opening theme to the anime series Kemono Friends.

Biography
Ōishi was born in Uwajima, Ehime on January 5, 1980. He graduated from the Kobe University of Commerce (now part of Hyogo University) and was a member of the school's light music club. In 1999, he and other members of the club formed the band Sound Schedule, making their major debut in 2001. Following the band's dissolution in 2006, he started a solo career, beginning with the release of his debut single  on June 25, 2008. This was followed by the release of his second single  on September 24, 2008. In November of that year, he released his first album .

In 2011, Sound Schedule decided to reunite after a five-year break, with Ōishi returning as the band's vocalist. Although the reunion was intended to be a temporary affair, at the end of the band's tour in 2012, it was announced that the band would continue its activities. Ōishi would remain as the band's vocalist while also continuing his solo career. In 2012, he released his third album .

In 2013, Ōishi released his fourth album . He also began collaborating with composer Tom Hack for musical releases. Their first collaboration was the single "Go Exceed!!" which was released on October 30, 2013; the title track was used as the first opening theme to the anime series Ace of Diamond. This was followed by the single "Perfect Hero" which was released on May 21, 2014; the title track is used as the second opening theme to Ace of Diamond. That same year, he released the single  on August 27; the title track is used as the opening theme to the anime series Monthly Girls' Nozaki-kun.

In 2015, Ōishi and Tom Hack formed the musical group OxT. The group's first single was "Kimero", the title track of which was used as the second ending theme to Ace of Diamond. The group has since performed theme songs for anime series such as Overlord, Prince of Stride, and Hand Shakers. That same year, Ōishi also released his fifth album .

In 2016, Ōishi wrote the song , which was used as the opening theme to the anime series Kemono Friends. The song became very popular in Japan, topping Amazon Japan's soundtrack ranking as well as ranking third in the country's iTunes song charts. His own cover received over one million views in the span of two weeks on Japanese video-sharing site Niconico. That same year, he wrote the song  by Ami Wajima, which was used as the second ending theme to the anime series Kuromukuro. He released his sixth album  on July 13, 2016.

In 2017, Ōishi released his seventh album , which included a cover of "Yōkoso Japari Park e". The following year, he released the single , the title track of which was used as the opening theme to the anime series Tada Never Falls in Love.

In 2018, Ōishi collaborated with Tsuburaya Productions for their 28 entry of the Ultraman Series, Ultraman R/B. Ōishi's song Hands was used as the shows opening, and another song Ultra Sing! was made for the album released to promote the series later in the year.

In 2020, Ōishi announced he had married a woman who is outside of the entertainment industry. In 2021 his song "Imperfect" was used as the opening theme to the anime series SSSS.Dynazenon.

Discography

Singles

Albums

References

External links
  
 

1980 births
Japanese singer-songwriters
Living people
People from Uwajima, Ehime
Musicians from Ehime Prefecture
21st-century Japanese singers
21st-century Japanese male singers